Daniele Gangemi (born 18 June 1980) is an Italian film director, screenwriter and cinematographer.

Biography
Daniele Gangemi was born on 18 June 1980.

At the age of fifteen he gets fascinated by the world of photography and starts experimenting, shooting and printing with a reflex camera and with all the tools that he could find at that time.

During those years he starts working as an author and a host at two of the local TV channels. His versatility brings him to the radio station and for more than fifteen years he is the speaker and author of several Sicilian radio programs.

Between 2002 and 2003 in Bologna was the time for his debut as a director, producer and author of the short film ”Alter Ego" (a super 8 shot sequence).

In 2007 Daniele is hired to take care of the photography in the historical-religious movie "Petali di Rosa" with Claudia Koll and Antonella Ponziani.

In 2008 he is in Catania directing his first movie "Una notte blu cobalto" ("Cobalt Blue Night") for which he also writes the plot and co-writes the script. In this movie there are popular and talented actors and actresses like Alessandro Haber, Corrado Fortuna, Regina Orioli and Valentina Carnelutti and the soundtrack is written and performed by Giuliano Sangiorgi who is the moving voice of the Italian Negramaro band.

In 2009 he is invited to the 42nd Worldfest International Independent Film Festival of Houston in Texas for the world premier of his movie "Una notte blu cobalto" getting the award for the ”Best First Feature".
In 2010 Bolero Film decides to bring his work to the movie theatres and in 2011 CG Home Video starts merchandising the DVDs of "Una notte blu cobalto" throughout the home video world.

In 2013, on the "XVII Giornata Bambini Vittime", the organization "Meter“ hires him to direct a campaign-spot against pedofilia dedicated to those kids who were victims.

The same year sees Daniele Gangemi's work appreciated by the ”BBC Music Video Festival“ with the music video "Safari Now" which he had created, co-written and directed and which is performed by Salvo Dub and oTs.

Filmography

Director and Screenwriter 
Alter Ego (2002, short film)
Una notte blu cobalto ("Cobalt Blue Night", 2008, first feature) *”Best First Feature" at the 42nd WIIFF of Houston 
Safari Now (2013, music video) *Official Selection - BBC Music Video Festival 2013

Cinematographer 
Petali di Rosa (2007, feature film) *"Cavallo d'Argento RAI 2007"

Awards
"Best First Feature" at the 42° "Worldfest International Independent Film Festival" ( Houston, Texas ) for the feature film "Una notte blu cobalto" ("Cobalt Blue Night")

External links
Daniele Gangemi interviewed by Antenna Sicilia
Film clip for the song "Safari Now"
Film clip from the movie "Una notte blu cobalto" ("Cobalt Blue Night")

Sources

"Una notte blu cobalto" ("Cobalt Blue Night") - Official Trailer
"Petali di Rosa" - Official Trailer
The BBC Music Video Festival website

1980 births
Living people
Italian film directors